Savage Eye is the eighth album by the English rock band Pretty Things, released in 1976. It was their second and last album on Led Zeppelin's Swan Song Records. The band broke up later the same year after the departure of lead singer Phil May.

Track listing

Personnel
The Pretty Things
Phil May – vocals
Pete Tolson – lead guitar, rhythm guitar, acoustic guitar, bass
Jon Povey – electric keyboards, harpsichord, vocals
Skip Alan – drums
Gordon John Edwards – vocals, keyboards, guitars
Jack Green – vocals, bass, acoustic guitar
Technical
Norman Smith – producer, saxophone
Keith Harwood – engineer

References

1976 albums
Pretty Things albums
Swan Song Records albums
Albums with cover art by Hipgnosis
Albums produced by Norman Smith (record producer)
Albums recorded at Olympic Sound Studios